Apostolos Katsifaras (born 1959 in Kalentzi, Achaea) is a Greek politician with PASOK. From 2004 on, he served as a member of the Hellenic Parliament, and shortly held the post of a deputy minister. Elected in 2010 and reelected in 2014, Katsifaras currently serves as the Regional Governor of Western Greece.

Biography

Education and early career
Apostolos Katsifaras was born 1959 in Kalentzi and is a nephew of former government minister Georgios Katsifaras. From 1981, following his graduation from the School of Economics and Management of the Technological Educational Institute of Patras, he worked for the Greek National Tourism Organization. Since the 1994 prefectural election, he also served as a prefectural councillor of Achaea. He was appointed and served as the Deputy Prefect of Achaea from 1997 until 2000  and he was Alternate Prefect between 2003 and 2004.

National political career
Following the 2004 legislative election, Katsifaras assumed a seat in the Hellenic Parliament representing the Achaea constituency, and was reelected in 2007 and 2009. In October 2009, Prime minister George Papandreou appointed him Deputy Minister of Justice, Transparency and Human Rights.

In the wake of the stirring trial against the police officers who killed Alexandros Grigoropoulos, militants attacked Katsifaras' first floor office in the Exarcheia neighborhood of Athens twice, once in November, and again in January 2010. Katsifaras said "Democracy cannot be coerced, nor bullied, nor killed. It responds with further enhancing individual and social rights, protection of the weak and eliminating disparities. Humanizing prisons, improved detention conditions and the protection of human rights will continue to be at the core of our policy."

In September 2010 Katzifaras resigned from his post to run for the office of the Regional Governor of Western Greece.

Governor of Western Greece
Supported by his PASOK party, Katsifaras clearly distanced Nea Dimokratia's candidate Georgios Papanastasiou in the 2010 regional election's second round, and became the first governor of the region to be newly created in the course of the Kallikratis reform. During his term, he was also the 1st Vice President of the Union of Greek Regions (ENPE).

Since 2011, Katsifaras has been a Member of the European Union Committee of the Regions where he sits with the PES Group. He also serves as the 1st Vice President of the CPMR Intermediterranean Commission.

In the 2014 regional election, he repeated his electoral success, this time running an independent platform. With 50.5%, he narrowly defeated ND candidate Andreas Katsaniotis in the second round, to serve another and this time a five year term.

References

External links
 
 
  

1959 births
Living people
Greek MPs 2004–2007
Greek MPs 2007–2009
Greek MPs 2009–2012
MPs of Achaea
Regional governors of Greece
People from Achaea